In chemistry, a cavitand is a container-shaped molecule.  The cavity of the cavitand allows it to engage in host–guest chemistry with guest molecules of a complementary shape and size.  The original definition proposed by Cram includes many classes of molecules: cyclodextrins, calixarenes, pillararenes and cucurbiturils. However, modern usage in the field of supramolecular chemistry specifically refers to cavitands formed on a resorcinarene scaffold by bridging adjacent phenolic units. The simplest bridging unit is methylene, although dimethylene, trimethylene,  benzal, xylyl, pyridyl, 2,3-disubstituted-quinoxaline, o-dinitrobenzyl, dialkylsilylene, and phosphonates are known.  Cavitands that have an extended aromatic bridging unit, or an extended cavity containing 3 rows of aromatic rings are referred to as deep-cavity cavitands and have broad applications in host-guest chemistry. These types of cavitands were extensively investigated by Rebek, and Gibb, among others.

Applications of Cavitands 
Specific cavitands form the basis of rigid templates onto which de novo proteins can be chemically linked. This template assembled synthetic protein (TASP) structure provides a platform for the study of protein structure.

Silicon surfaces functionalized with tetraphosphonate cavitands have been used to singularly detect sarcosine in water and urine solutions.

See also
Molecular recognition

References

Supramolecular chemistry
Chelating agents